This is a list of selected geodesic polyhedra and Goldberg polyhedra, two infinite classes of polyhedra. Geodesic polyhedra and Goldberg polyhedra are duals of each other.

Icosahedral

Octahedral

Tetrahedral

References
 Reprinted by Dover 1999 

 
 
Mathematics-related lists